Target Center is a multi-purpose arena located in Minneapolis that opened in 1990. It hosts major family shows, concerts, sporting events, graduations and private events. Target Corporation, founded and headquartered in Minneapolis since 1902, has held the naming rights to the arena since its opening.

The arena has been the home to the Minnesota Timberwolves of the National Basketball Association (NBA) since its opening and is currently also the home of the Minnesota Lynx of the Women's National Basketball Association (WNBA). The facility has also hosted the LFL's Minnesota Valkyrie, the RHI's Minnesota Arctic Blast and the Arena Football League's Minnesota Fighting Pike in the past.

Target Center is the second-oldest arena in the NBA after Madison Square Garden, which was built in 1968.

History

Management
Original Timberwolves owners Marv Wolfenson and Harvey Ratner built, owned and operated the arena for five years beginning in 1990. The venue was managed by Ogden Entertainment after the city of Minneapolis purchased the arena in 1995. Glen Taylor acquired the Timberwolves in 1994 and the Lynx in 1999.

In 2000, SFX (later Clear Channel Entertainment) took over the contract. The management was changed in May 2004 from Clear Channel to Midwest Entertainment Group, a joint venture of the Timberwolves and Nederlander Concerts.

On May 2, 2007, AEG Facilities assumed the management contract of Target Center. The city of Minneapolis owns the arena and AEG Facilities manages day-to-day operations.

Renovations
In 2004, Target Center underwent a major renovation that saw the replacement of all 19,006 of its original seats plus the addition of nearly 1,500 new seats as well as the reconfiguration of the lower bowl to make the arena more "fan-friendly". In addition the arena's original scoreboard was replaced with a new  video screen and LED signage, LED signage on the upper deck fascia, a new lounge (Club Cambria) and improved access for fans with disabilities.

Target Center was once one of three NBA arenas with parquet floors, including TD Garden in Boston, and Amway Arena (later Amway Center) in Orlando—the floor was replaced prior to the 2007-08 NBA season.

Target Center is the first arena to have a green roof. It was unveiled on September 15, 2009. In February 2011, the Timberwolves and the city of Minneapolis introduced a $155 million proposal to remodel the Target Center. Plans included shifting the main entrance to the corner of 6th Street and First Avenue, two large glass atriums, another restaurant, and a complete remodel of the interior. The plan was approved in 2012 by the Minnesota Legislature, as part of the bill that authorized a new stadium for the Minnesota Vikings.

On April 3, 2015, the Minneapolis City Council gave the final approval for renovation plans for Target Center. The total cost was $140 million, which upgraded the exterior, seats, technology and loading bays, among other areas. The city contributed $74 million. Glen Taylor, owner of the Timberwolves and Lynx, paid a total of $60 million; AEG contributed $5.9 million. As a result, the Timberwolves' lease will run until 2035. The renovated building reopened in October 2017.

Naming rights
On August 7, 1990, it was announced that Target had purchased the naming rights of the Timberwolves' arena and that it would be called Target Center. Since then, the naming rights have been renewed every five years. Target extended its naming rights agreement through 2014 in September 2011. In 2012, a "Target Dog" neon sign was installed to face towards Target Field as a home run celebration sign.

Basketball
It hosted the 1994 NBA All-Star Game, the 1995 NCAA Women's Final Four, 2000 NBA draft and the 2018 WNBA All-Star Game.  It had been slated to host an NCAA Men's Regional Final in 2021, but on November 16, 2020, the NCAA announced that it would hold the entire tournament in one city, seeming to rule out Minneapolis. The Target Center hosted the 2022 NCAA Women's Final Four.

In 2011, the Target Center played host to its first championship event, the 2011 WNBA Finals. The Minnesota Lynx won their first two games on their home floor, and ultimately won the WNBA Championship, the first title won by a team that played in Target Center.

On April 20, 2022, it was announced that the Target Center will host the Big Ten women's basketball tournament in 2023 and 2024 and the Big Ten men's basketball tournament in 2024.

Ice hockey
The NHL's Minnesota North Stars refused to move into Target Center upon its opening due to conflicting soft drink rights (their home at the time, the Met Center was served by Pepsi whereas the Target Center's pouring rights belonged to Coca-Cola). Despite this, the arena did host 6 neutral site NHL games during the 1993–94 NHL season after the North Stars' departure to Dallas, including one in which the Stars participated. The International Hockey League's Minnesota Moose played several of their games at Target Center during their existence from 1994 to 1996. The Boys' State High School Hockey Tournament was held at Target Center in 1998 and 1999. In June 2012, it was announced that the arena would play host to the future NCHC tournament games starting in 2014. The NCHC moved the tournament to the Xcel Energy Center (home of the Twin Cities' current NHL franchise, the Wild) in nearby St. Paul starting in 2018.

Notable events

Concerts
The arena has been a popular venue that has hosted many concerts, including artists like Taylor Swift, Billy Joel, Celine Dion, Garth Brooks, Justin Bieber, Elton John, Katy Perry, Metallica, Paul McCartney, and Minnesota legend Prince.

Concert history
1990

1991

1992

1993

1994

1995

1996

U2 – May 1, 2001, September 23, 2005
Bruce Springsteen – November 29, 1999
Josh Groban – February 23, 2005
Garth Brooks – October 4, 1999 – October 14, 1999 (nine concerts)
Jeff Foxworthy – June 23, 2007
Prince – July 7, 2007
The Moody Blues – July 15, 2007
Nickelback – July 23, 2007, with Staind and Daughtry 
Hilary Duff – August 23, 2007
Joan Sebastian and Pepe Aguilar – September 29, 2007
Sugarland – October 13, 2007, April 17, 2009, May 7, 2011
Miley Cyrus – October 21, 2007, as herself and Hannah Montana with Jonas Brothers and October 29, 2009, with Metro Station
Van Halen – October 24, 2007
Ozzy Osbourne – October 31, 2007
Trans-Siberian Orchestra – December 15, 2007
Dancing with the Stars – January 3, 2008
Sesame Street Live – January 16–20, 2008
Martina McBride – January 26, 2008
Jonas Brothers – February 20, 2008
Foo Fighters – February 27, 2008
Avril Lavigne – March 20, 2008
Three Days Grace – March 24, 2008
Alicia Keys – April 30, 2008
Kid Rock – January 7–10, 2000, August 5, 2000,  March 13, 2004, and May 24, 2008
True Colors Tour – June 9, 2008
Kanye West – June 11, 2008
Steve Miller Band – July 3, 2008
Tom Petty – July 23, 2008
Nine Inch Nails – August 2, 2008
American Idols LIVE! Tour 2008 – August 31, 2008
Rage Against the Machine – September 3, 2008
Journey & Cheap Trick – September 16, 2008
The Eagles – September 30, 2008
Oasis – December 10, 2008
Gorillaz – October 17, 2010
Selena Gomez – November 21, 2013
Celine Dion – November 1, 2019, as part of her Courage World Tour
for KING & COUNTRY – November 9, 2019, December 11, 2021
Dua Lipa – March 1, 2022, as part of her Future Nostalgia Tour
Justin Bieber - May 6. 2022, as part of his Justice World Tour
Roger Waters - July 30, 2022, as part of his This Is Not a Drill Tour
Muse (band) - February 26, 2023, as part of their Will of the People World Tour

MMA & professional wrestling
WWE has held many events at this venue and is best known for SummerSlam 1999, Judgment Day 2005, Bragging Rights 2010, Elimination Chamber 2014, TLC: Tables, Ladders & Chairs 2017 & TLC: Tables, Ladders & Chairs 2019.

Professional wrestling promotion All Elite Wrestling taped an episode of their weekly television show AEW Rampage at the center on November 12, 2021. The center also hosted that year's edition of their annual pay-per-view event Full Gear, which occurred the following day. AEW made their Dynamite taping debut on August 10th 2022 for a special episode entitled "Quake by the Lake"

The Target Center held the memorable UFC championship UFC 87: Seek and Destroy in August 2008, which featured the Welterweight title match where Georges St-Pierre defeated Jon Fitch.

On October 5, 2012, UFC on FX: Browne vs. Bigfoot was held at the venue.

On June 29, 2019, UFC on ESPN: Ngannou vs. dos Santos was held at the venue.

Gymnastics
In 2016, the arena hosted the Kellogg's Tour of Gymnastics Champions.

Other events
In 1991, the center hosted the 1991 U.S. Figure Skating Championships, where skater Tonya Harding became the first American woman and second in the world to land a triple axel jump in competition. Harding took home the gold medal.

In 1999, Target Center hosted the "People's Celebration" inaugural event for Gov. Jesse Ventura. The event drew 14,000 people, and included performances by Jonny Lang, Warren Zevon, and America.

The Professional Bull Riders held a Built Ford Tough Series event at Target Center during the 2003 and 2006 seasons.

The Target Center hosted the Rally for the Republic convention organized by the Campaign for Liberty, a movement founded by Texas Congressman Ron Paul, who ran an unsuccessful bid for the 2008 Republican presidential nomination. Among the attendees of the convention were former Governor of Minnesota Jesse Ventura, Barry Goldwater Jr., and former Governor of New Mexico Gary Johnson.

The Target Center is home to the Target Corporation Annual Sales Meeting, events that host more than 10,000 retail managers and employees near Target's corporate offices. In 2018, Dave Matthews performed a short set at the event.

President Donald Trump held a rally at the arena on October 10, 2019.

Hot Wheels Monster Trucks Live hosted their Glow Party event at the arena on November 19, 2022.

Attendance records
The current confirmed highest attendance record for a single event in the arena's history was the Timberwolves and Warriors game on March 10, 2017, attended by 20,412 people. 
The highest grossing one-day event was UFC on August 8, 2009.

U.S. Bank Theater
Target Center can convert into a 2,500-to-7,500-seat theater known as the U.S. Bank Theater. The Theater contains a movable floor-to-ceiling curtain system that allows the venue to be transformed based on specific show needs. In addition to concerts, the U.S. Bank Theater can also be used for family and Broadway shows.

Transportation and location
Target Center is a block away from the following Metro Transit stations:
 Warehouse District/Hennepin Avenue, served by the Metro Blue and Green light rail lines
 Ramp A/7th St. Transit Center that serves 11 bus routes
 Ramp B/5th St. Transit Center that serves 10 bus routes
 
The arena is also across the street from the well-known Minneapolis nightclub First Avenue. Target Field, the home of Major League Baseball's Minnesota Twins, is located just across the street from the Target Center, and shares the public parking that the arena also uses.

References

External links

Target Center Renovation, Official by the Target Center.

1990 establishments in Minnesota
Basketball venues in Minnesota
Gymnastics venues in the United States
Indoor ice hockey venues in Minneapolis
Event venues established in 1990
Sports venues completed in 1990
Minnesota Lynx venues
Minnesota Timberwolves venues
Mixed martial arts venues in the United States
National Basketball Association venues
Sports venues in Minneapolis
Target Corporation
Minnesota Arctic Blast
Indoor arenas in Minnesota